Yoodhapuram shrine in the name of St. Jude is situated at Kidangoor around one kilometer from Angamally towards Manjapra. The foundation stone for St. Jude Thaddeus Roman Catholic Church, was laid on 26 July 1999. Angamaly is one of the prominent hub of Syro Malabar Catholics with the proximity of blessed pilgrim center Malayatoor in the name of St. Thomas.

This landmark church is very famous for the enormous blessings from St.Jude and is under the Archdiocese of Verapoly . Besides the mass on every day, the novena and special prayers are conducted on every Thursdays. The feast and associated oottuthirunnal is celebrated during the last week of October every year. Approximately 150,000 people attends the feast on a single day of celebration without any disruption.

In the Roman Catholic Church St.Jude is the patron saint of desperate cases and lost causes. It is believed that, if you pray with St.Jude and attend the novena for 7–9 days, what ever be you problem, it will have a solution. In 1982, the police force in Chicago adopted him as their Patron Saint. The believers visiting this shrine includes students for higher studies, people suffering from diseases, for jobs, family problems ....etc. The church is committed towards helping students who has the stuff with them, but don't have enough financial capacity to complete studies. These invaluable activities are done irrespective of the religious, cultural, geographic or political background.

It is a real experience in life to be in this divine place and pray for the blessings from St.Jude.

Churches in Angamaly
Roman Catholic churches in Kerala
Roman Catholic churches completed in 1999
1999 establishments in Kerala
20th-century Roman Catholic church buildings in India